Ryūjin (龍神), which in some traditions is equivalent to Ōwatatsumi, was the tutelary deity of the sea in Japanese mythology. In many versions Ryūjin had the ability to transform into a human shape. Many believed the god had knowledge on medicine and many considered him as the bringer of rain and thunder, Ryūjin is also the patron god (ujigami) of several family groups.

This Japanese dragon, symbolizing the power of the ocean, had a large mouth. He is considered a good god and patron of Japan, since the Japanese population has for millennia lived off the bounty of the sea. Ryūjin is also credited with the challenge of a hurricane which sank the Mongolian flotilla sent by Kublai Khan. Ryūjin lived in Ryūgū-jō, his palace under the sea built out of red and white coral, from where he controlled the tides with magical tide jewels. Sea turtles, fish, jellyfish, snakes, other sea creatures are often seen as Ryūjin's servants.

Mythology

How the jellyfish lost its bones 
One legend involving Ryūjin is the story about how the jellyfish lost its bones. According to this story, Ryūjin wanted to eat monkey's liver (in some versions of the story, to heal an incurable rash), and sent the jellyfish to get him a monkey. The monkey managed to sneak away from the jellyfish by telling him that he had put his liver in a jar in the forest and offered to go and get it. As the jellyfish came back and told Ryūjin what had happened, Ryūjin became so angry that he beat the jellyfish until its bones were crushed.

The Tale of Tawara Tōda 

One myth involves Ryūjin asking a man by the name of Tawara Tōda to help him get rid of a giant centipede attacking his kingdom. Tawara Tōda agrees to help Ryūjin and Tawara Tōda accompanies Ryūjin back to his home. When Tawara Tōda killed the centipede, Ryūjin awarded him with a bag of rice.

Empress Jingu 
According to legend, the Empress Jingū was able to carry out her attack into Korea with the help of Ryūjin's tide jewels. Some versions of the legend say that Empress Jingū asked Isora to go down to Ryūjin's palace and retrieve the tide jewels.

Upon confronting the Korean navy, Jingū threw the  into the sea, and the tide receded. The Korean fleet was stranded, and the men got out of their ships. An annual festival, called Gion Matsuri, at Yasaka Shrine celebrates this legend.

Family 
Ryūjin was the father of the beautiful goddess Toyotama-hime who married the hunter prince Hoori. The first Emperor of Japan, Emperor Jimmu, is said to have been a grandson of Otohime and Hoori's. Thus, Ryūjin is said to be one of the ancestors of the Japanese imperial dynasty.

Worship
 is a form of Shinto religious belief that worships dragons as water kami. It is connected with agricultural rituals, rain prayers, and the success of fishermen.

The god has shrines across Japan and especially in rural areas where fishing and rains for agriculture are important for local communities.

In art

References

External links
 Ryūjin shinkō, Encyclopedia of Shinto
Netsuke: masterpieces from the Metropolitan Museum of Art, an exhibition catalog from The Metropolitan Museum of Art (fully available online as PDF), which contains many representations of Ryūjin

Japanese gods
Japanese dragons
Sea and river gods
Shinto kami